Stephensia unipunctella is a moth of the family Elachistidae. It is found in Spain.

References

Moths described in 1978
Elachistidae
Moths of Europe